Moulin Rouge is a 1928 British silent drama film directed by Ewald André Dupont and starring Olga Chekhova, Eve Gray and Jean Bradin. The film is set in and around the Moulin Rouge cabaret in Paris.

Production
The film was made at Elstree Studios by British International Pictures. It was Dupont's last fully silent film, although several of his later sound films were released with silent versions. Dupont was one of a number of leading Continental technicians and actors hired by BIP in the late 1920s to try and establish the company as a leading international producer. Alfred Junge worked as Art Director.

Cast
Olga Chekhova as Parysia
Eve Gray as Margaret
Jean Bradin as Andre
Georges Tréville as father
Marcel Vibert as Marquis
Ellen Pollock as Girt
Andrews Engelmann as chauffeur
Forrester Harvey as tourist

Restoration and home media
Moulin Rouge was originally released in 1928 as a silent film with live musical accompaniment, running approximately 130 minutes. The following year, it was edited and re-released with a synchronised score composed by John Reynders, which included various sound effects. This version ran for 86 minutes and is available from several budget DVD labels.

In 2017, the film was restored in HD to close to its original running time, at 127 minutes. Reynder's 1929 score was repurposed for this version, but as it was considerably shorter, over 120 music edits were made in order for it to fit. The restored version has been released in the UK on Blu-ray and DVD by Network.

See also
Moulin Rouge, 1952 film
Moulin Rouge!, 2001 film

References

Bibliography
St. Pierre, Paul Matthew. E.A. Dupont and his Contribution to British Film: Varieté, Moulin Rouge, Piccadilly, Atlantic, Two Worlds, Cape Forlorn. Fairleigh Dickinson University Press, 2010. .

External links

Moulin Rouge at Silent Era

1928 drama films
Films shot at British International Pictures Studios
British silent feature films
British drama films
Films directed by E. A. Dupont
Films set in the Moulin Rouge
British black-and-white films
1920s British films
Silent drama films
1920s English-language films